Sorgà is a comune  in the province of Verona, Veneto, northern Italy.

It is the birthplace of the Italian racing car driver Antonio Ascari, father of the Italian champion Alberto Ascari.

References

Cities and towns in Veneto